Herrickia wasatchensis  is a North American species of flowering plants in the family Asteraceae, called the Wasatch aster. It has been found only in the states of Utah and Arizona in the western United States.

Herrickia wasatchensis is a perennial herb up to 60 centimeters (2 feet) tall from a woody underground caudex. The plant produces flower heads in groups of 2-20 or more heads. Each head contains 13–21 white or pink ray florets surrounding 26–43 yellow disc florets.

References

Astereae
Flora of Arizona
Flora of Utah
Plants described in 1895
Flora without expected TNC conservation status